Guan may refer to:

 Guan (surname), several similar Chinese surnames
 Guān, Chinese surname
 Guan (state), ancient Chinese city-state
 Guan (bird), any of a number of bird species of the family Cracidae, of South and Central America
 Guan (instrument), a Chinese wind instrument
 Guan (headwear), a Chinese hat
 Guang people, or Guan people, a people of modern Ghana
 Mandarin (bureaucrat), bureaucrat scholar in the government of imperial China 
 String of cash coins (currency unit), an old currency unit used for Chinese cash coins
 Guan ware, one of the Five Great Kilns of Song dynasty China

 Locations in China
 Gu'an County (固安县), Hebei
Gu'an Town (固安镇), seat of Gu'an County
 Guan County, Shandong (冠县)
 Dujiangyan City (灌县), formerly Guan County, Sichuan

See also
 Kwon
 Kuan (disambiguation)
 Kwan (disambiguation)
 Quan (disambiguation)
 Quon (disambiguation)